Austria competed at the FIS Alpine World Ski Championships 2021 in Cortina d'Ampezzo, Austria, from 8 to 21 February 2021.

Medalists

References

External links
 Österreichischer Skiverband 
 Cortina 2021 official site

Nations at the FIS Alpine World Ski Championships 2021
Alpine World Ski Championships
Austria at the FIS Alpine World Ski Championships